Bangladesh Association of Banks is an industry trade body of private banks in Bangladesh that represents the interests of the banking industry. Nazrul Islam Mazumder, chairperson of Exim Bank, is the Chairman of the Bangladesh Association of Banks.

History
Bangladesh Association of Banks was established in 1993 by nine private banks. The founding members were Al Baraka Bank Pakistan, AB Bank, The City Bank, IFIC Bank, National Bank Limited, United Commercial Bank Ltd, and Uttara Bank Limited. The first meeting was held on 12 December 1993 at the Hotel Sheraton (currently the InterContinental Dhaka). By 2018, membership had risen 38 private banks. In 2020, Bangladesh Association of Banks proposed to set up Mujib corners in the headquarters of all private banks of Bangladesh.

References

1993 establishments in Bangladesh
Organisations based in Dhaka
Trade associations based in Bangladesh
Banking in Bangladesh